The 2002 British Formula Three season was the 52nd British Formula Three Championship season. It commenced on 31 March and ended on 22 September, after twenty-six races.

Drivers and teams
The following teams and drivers were competitors in the 2002 season. The Scholarship class is for older Formula Three cars.

Race calendar and results

Notes:
1. – The second race at the Croft meeting was cancelled due to poor weather conditions. It was run at the Snetterton meeting.

Standings

References

http://www.speedsport-magazine.com/motorsport/formula-level3/british-formula-3/2002/entrylist.html

External links
 The official website of the British Formula 3 Championship

British Formula Three Championship seasons
Formula Three season
British
British Formula 3